Hex is a 2015 Nigerian horror short film directed by Clarence Peters. Screened and premiered on 12 November 2015 at the 5th Africa International Film Festival, Hex went on to win the award for "Best Short Film" at the same event.

Background
Hex is the debut movie of Clarence Peters. Shot in Lagos with a total runtime of 26 minutes, the official trailer of the movie was released on 28 September 2015.

Cast
Ayoola Ayolola as Olabode
Kunle Remi as Emeka
Nancy Isime as Chioma
Roseline Afije (Liquorose) as Bola
Scarlet Shotade as Abiodun

Awards and accolades

References

External links

2015 films
English-language Nigerian films
Horror short films
2015 horror films
2010s English-language films